Antaeotricha epicrossa is a moth in the family Depressariidae. It was described by Edward Meyrick in 1932. It is found in Peru.

References

Moths described in 1932
epicrossa
Taxa named by Edward Meyrick
Moths of South America